Dorrance can refer to:

People
Surname:
 Anson Dorrance, American soccer coach
 Arthur Calbraith Dorrance, American businessman
 Daniel G. Dorrance (1811–1896), New York politician
 John Thompson Dorrance, American businessman
 Michelle Dorrance, American dancer and choreographer
 Tom and Bill Dorrance, founders of the Natural Horsemanship movement
Given name:
 Dory Funk, American wrestler and promoter
 Dory Funk Jr, American wrestler and trainer

Fictional characters
Edmund Dorrance, DC comics character better known by his alias King Snake
Dorrance, first name unknown, son of Edmund Dorrance better known as Bane

Places
In the United States:
 Dorrance, Kansas
 Dorrance Township, Luzerne County, Pennsylvania

Businesses
 Dorrance Publishing Co. a vanity press publisher